Protadisura is a genus of moths of the family Noctuidae.

Species
Protadisura posttriphaena Rothschild, 1924

References
Natural History Museum Lepidoptera genus database

Heliothinae